Zoltán Balázsfi (born 7 July 1962) is a Hungarian weightlifter. He competed in the men's middle heavyweight event at the 1988 Summer Olympics.

References

1962 births
Living people
Hungarian male weightlifters
Olympic weightlifters of Hungary
Weightlifters at the 1988 Summer Olympics
Sportspeople from Szeged
World Weightlifting Championships medalists